The Indian Queen (Z. 630) is a largely unfinished semi-opera with music by Henry Purcell, first performed at the Theatre Royal, Drury Lane, London, in 1695. The exact date is unknown, but Peter Holman surmises it may have been in June.

It was created as a revised version of the 1664 play The Indian Queen, in a prologue and five acts, by John Dryden and his brother-in-law Sir Robert Howard. More specifically, in 1694, Thomas Betterton was given £50 to transform the play into an opera, and he commissioned Purcell to compose the music. Purcell, who died in November 1695, left music only for the Prologue and Acts II and III. His brother Daniel completed a masque for Act V.

The Indian Queen is one of Purcell's less often performed stage works. This is probably more a reflection of the incomplete state of the score than of its quality.

Sellars' 2013 realization
In the twenty-first century there was a major new production by Tchaikovsky Perm Opera and Ballet Theatre (Perm), Teatro Real (Madrid), and English National Opera (London). Peter Sellars completely rewrote the text to tell the story of the Spanish Conquista.  He drew on a book by the Nicaraguan writer Rosario Aguilar. This version, with designs by Gronk, was premiered at Perm in 2013.  It was performed at the Teatro Real in 2014, when Sellars said spectators who responded negatively, especially to the end of the first part where Indians are machine-gunned by Spanish soldiers, “don’t understand that a work like this is about trying to complete a journey together through difficult issues and history.”

Synopsis
Some years before the Spanish Conquest in Mesoamerica—the court then war conflict between kings of Peru and Mexico.

Musical numbers

Movt. 1, 1st Music, (Air and Hornpipe)
Movt. 2, 2nd Music, (Air and Hornpipe)
Movt. 3, Overture, (Grave and Canzon)
Prologue
Movt. 4a, Trumpet Tune
Movt. 4b, Aria, "Wake Quivera, wake"
Movt. 4c, Prelude
Movt. 4d, Aria, "Why should men quarrel"
Act 2 
Movt. 5, Symphony
Movt. 6, Aria and Chorus, "I come to sing great Zempoalla's story"
Movt. 7, Trio, "What flatt'ring noise is this"
Movt. 8, Trumpet tune
Movt. 9, Symphony
Movt. 10, Dance
Movt. 11, 2nd Act Music (Trumpet Tune reprise)
Act 3
Movt. 12, Dance
Movt. 13, Aria, "Ye twice ten hundred deities"
Movt. 14, Symphony
Movt. 15, Aria, "Seek not to know what must not be reveal'd"
Movt. 16, Trumpet Overture (Canzon and Adagio)
Movt. 17a, Duet and Quartet, "Ah! Ah! How happy are we!"
Movt. 17h, Aria, "I attempt from love's sickness to fly"
Movt. 18, 3rd Act Tune (Rondeau)
Movt. 19, Aria, "They tell us that you mighty powers above"
Movt. 20, 4th Act Tune
Movt. 21a, Prelude and Chorus, "While thus we bow before your shrine"
Movt. 21b, Aria, "You who at the altar stand"
Movt. 21c, Prelude
Movt. 21d, Chorus, "All dismal sounds thus on these off'rings wait"
Movt. 22, Air

Recordings
The Indian Queen Soloists, St. Anthony Singers, English Chamber Orchestra, conducted by Charles Mackerras (Decca L'Oiseau-Lyre, 1966)
The Indian Queen Soloists, Deller Singers, King's Musick, conducted by Alfred Deller (Harmonia Mundi)
The Indian Queen Soloists, Monteverdi Choir, English Baroque Soloists, conducted by John Eliot Gardiner (Erato, 1980)
The Indian Queen Soloists, Academy of Ancient Music, conducted by Christopher Hogwood (Decca L'Oiseau-Lyre, 1995)
The Indian Queen Soloists, The Purcell Simfony and the Purcell Simfony Voices (Linn, 1995)
The Indian Queen Soloists, Scholars' Baroque Ensemble (Naxos, 1998)
The Indian Queen Soloists, London Chamber Singers, London Chamber Orchestra. conducted by [(Anthony Bernard)] (Music Guild MS-124, 196x?)

References
Notes

Sources
Holden, Amanda (Ed.), The New Penguin Opera Guide, New York: Penguin Putnam, 2001 
Warrack, John and West, Ewan, The Oxford Dictionary of Opera New York: OUP: 1992

External links
 About plot
 Synopsis

1695 operas
Operas by Henry Purcell
English-language operas
Operas
 Operas set in North America
 Operas set in Mexico